Tobias Harro Christensen (born 4 January 1995) is a Danish footballer who plays as a winger for Boldklubben VLI.

References

External links

1995 births
Living people
Sportspeople from Frederiksberg
Danish men's footballers
Association football wingers
Danish Superliga players
Danish 1st Division players
Danish 2nd Division players
Segunda División B players
F.C. Copenhagen players
FC Helsingør players
Næstved Boldklub players
Elche CF Ilicitano footballers
FC Jumilla players
HB Køge players
Vendsyssel FF players
B36 Tórshavn players
Boldklubben af 1893 players
Denmark youth international footballers
Danish expatriate men's footballers
Danish expatriate sportspeople in Spain
Expatriate footballers in Spain
Expatriate footballers in the Faroe Islands